The European Initiative Prize is a journalism prize, created in 2003 by the Maison de l’Europe de Paris and the European Press Club with the support of the European Parliament. The prize is awarded annually to media contributors who distinguished themselves with high quality work on European Union topics.

The award ceremony takes place every year in June at the Maison de l’Europe de Paris within the Hotel de Villiers, private mansion of the 19th century, property of the City of Paris and situated in the 17th district of Paris.

The ceremony is usually preceded by a debate on European topics. The jury – currently chaired by former MEP and  Catherine Lalumière, President of the Maison de l’Europe de Paris – consists of French and European intellectuals. The Prize consists of a diploma of honour and of a piece of art, offered by the European Parliament. Usually, three "ex æquo" prizes are awarded annually.

List of Laureates

2019 Edition 

 Alain Devalpo, association Globe Reporters
 Caroline Gillet, reporter of France Inter and France Culture for her French show « Foule Continentale »
 Jon Henley, correspondent for The Guardian

2018 Edition 

 Sylvain Kahn, professor and researcher at Sciences Po
 Marie-Christine Vallet, director of the European editorial at Radio France
 Voix d'Europe, blog created by two editors Virginie Cardoso and Chloé Lourenço
 The Vox Pop programme on Arte, represented by Marc Berdugo, producer of the show

2017 Edition 

 Olivier Breton, director of 
 Jacques Delors, former President of the European Commission
 Enrico Letta, former Secretary to the Council of Ministers of Italy and president of the Jacques Delors Institute

2016 Edition 

Christophe Ayad, member of the Panama Papers project, journalist for the French newspaper Le Monde
Franck Bourgeron, managing editor, La Revue Dessinée
Daniel Cohn-Bendit for his journalistic work
France Télévisions

2015 Edition 

 Cartooning for Peace
 Eurochannel
 Le Nouvel Observateur'''s Journées Europe 2014 Edition 
 Yves Bertoncini, Notre Europe –Jacques Delors Institute & Thierry Chopin, Robert Schuman Foundation (France) for their report: Des visages sur des clivages : les élections européennes de mai 2014  Europavox
 Public Sénat

 2013 Edition 
 Kattalin Landaburu, France 24
 Rudolf Chimelli, journaliste
 Euronews

 2012 Edition 
 Nicolas Gros-Verheyde of Bruxelles2.eu
 Érik Izraelewicz, director of Le Monde
 Stefan de Vries, journalist

 2011 Edition 
 Daniel Desesquelle presenting the Carrefour de l'Europe programme on 5 avril 2013 in Strasbourg.
 Alberto Toscano, journalist
 Pascal Verdeau, journalist, France 3

 2010 Edition 
 Paul Germain, Le Bar de l’Europe TV5 Monde
 , Le Téléphone sonne – spécial Europe – France Inter
 , Libération newspaper

 2008 Edition 
 Françoise Crouïgneau, chief international editor, Les Échos daily newspaper
  for Kiosque on TV5 Monde
 Jean-Pierre Gouzy, former president of the European Journalist Association (AJE)

 2009 Edition 
 , rédactrice en chef de la rédaction Européenne de France 3
 Courrier International
 , directeur chargé des Affaires européennes – Radio France

 2007 Edition 
 , président d’Arte
 Daniel Vernet, directeur des Relations Internationales 
 Laurence Aubron pour 

 2006 Edition 
 Ferdinando Riccardi, Marina Gazzo, editors of l’Agence Europe , director general of Les Dernières Nouvelles d'Alsace Bernard Guetta, journalist and columnist at France Inter and L'Express 2005 Edition 
 Christine Ockrent for the programme France Europe Express on France 3
 , Director -General, President of Ouest-France newspaper

 2004 Edition 
  – online magazine
 France Culture's Cause Commune Anne-marie Autissier for her review, Culture Europe International''
 La Croix newspaper

References 

Awards established in 2003
French journalism awards